Qihe may refer to:

 Qihe County (齐河县), a county in Shandong Province.
 Qihe, Taoyuan (漆河镇), a town in Taoyuan County, Shandong Province. 
 Qihe Station (骑河站), Line 2, Rail Transit of Suzhou.